The Sunshine Open Invitational  was a PGA Tour event that played for one year at the Bayshore Country Club in Miami Beach, Florida. The 72-hole tournament was held from March 23–26, 1961; and was won by then 25-year-old Gary Player with a score of 273. Player received $3,500 in winnings. Arnold Palmer finished second winning $2,300. The Bayshore Country Club, now known as Miami Beach Golf Club, opened in 1923.

Winners

References

Former PGA Tour events
Golf in Florida
Sports competitions in Miami